1920 in philosophy

Events

Publications

Births 
 May 12 - Vilém Flusser (died 1991)
 July 13 - Hans Blumenberg (died 1996)
 October 3 - Philippa Foot (died 2010)

Deaths 
 June 14 - Max Weber (born 1864)
 August 31 - Wilhelm Wundt (born 1832)
 November 27 - Alexius Meinong (born 1853)

References 

Philosophy
20th-century philosophy
Philosophy by year